Danika may refer to:

People
 Danika Atchia (born 1997), Mauritian model
 Danika Bourne (born 1981), Australian ice dancer
 Danika Brace, American football coach and former player
 Danika Yarosh (born 1998), American actress

Other uses 

 Danika (film), 2006 psychological thriller film

See also
 Danica (given name)